The Panhard K 101 is a forward control truck aimed at military and commercial use produced between 1937 and 1940 by the French manufacturer Panhard.

History
The 3.5-tonne payload K 101 was introduced by Panhard in direct competition with the new forward control AGx range from Renault. The company produced 816 K 101s, of which 491 were delivered to the French military (from 1939 onwards). Between 1939 and 1940 Panhard also produced a gasifier-equipped version known as K 128, as part of a plan by the French army for using gasifiers at the 10% of the vehicles. 31 units were produced. The Panhards K 128 (and the heavier 5-tonne payload K 48) were the only trucks with gasifier delivered to the French military during World War II.

Technical details

References

Citations

Bibliography

K 101
Cab over vehicles
Vehicles introduced in 1937